The Castleford, Normanton and District Hospital was a health facility in  Lumley Street, Castleford, West Yorkshire, England. It was managed by South West Yorkshire Partnership NHS Foundation Trust.

History
The facility was commissioned in 1924: it was available to patients from 1926 but not officially opened by Princess Mary until 23 August 1929. During the 1930s a significant amount of its funding came from Henry Briggs, Son and Co., a local coal mining business. It joined the National Health Service in 1948. A new 120-bed mental health unit opened in the 1970s.

After services transferred to Pontefract Hospital, the hospital closed in 2017. The buildings were demolished in summer 2018 and the site was subsequently developed by Persimmon for residential use.

References

Hospitals established in 1924
1924 establishments in England
Hospital buildings completed in 1924
Hospitals in West Yorkshire
Defunct hospitals in England
Castleford